Baljinnyamyn Amarsaikhan is a Mongolian actor and producer, known for Thief of the Mind (2011) and Trapped Abroad (2014).

Thief of the Mind (or Mind Thief) produced by Amarsaikhan and directed by Janchivdorj Sengedorj won the Grand Prix for Best Film in 2011 during the Mongolian 2012 Academy Awards with Amarsaikhan also winning the award for "Best Lead Role - Actor" during the same event. The film also won Best Supporting Role, Best Cinematography, Best Screenplay and Best Sound Editing. Amarsaikhan was honored for his "valuable commitment in the development of the Mongolian film industry" at the event.

He currently appears in Marco Polo, a television drama series about Marco Polo's early years in the court of Kublai Khan; Amarsaikhan plays Ariq Böke. The show premiered on Netflix in December 2014. The series is produced by The Weinstein Company.

Filmography 
Acting
2011: Thief of the Mind as Gantulga
2012: Aravt
2014: Trapped Abroad as Garid
2014: Marco Polo (TV series)
2016: The Faith as Itgel
2019: The Mongolian Connection as Ganzorig 
The Mongolian Connection as Ganzorig
Production
2011: Thief of the Mind  
2014: Trapped Abroad
2016: The Faith

References

External links

Mongolian male film actors
Mongolian male television actors
1977 births
Living people
People from Ulaanbaatar
Mongolian screenwriters
21st-century Mongolian actors